The 2021 St. Petersburg Open was a tennis tournament played on indoor hard courts. It was the 26th edition of the St. Petersburg Open, and part of the ATP World Tour 250 Series of the 2021 ATP Tour. It took place at the Sibur Arena in Saint Petersburg, Russia, from October 25 through 31, 2021.

Champions

Singles

 Marin Čilić def.  Taylor Fritz, 7–6(7–3), 4–6, 6–4

Doubles

 Jamie Murray /  Bruno Soares def.  Andrey Golubev /  Hugo Nys, 6–3, 6–4

Singles main-draw entrants

Seeds

 Rankings are as of 18 October 2021

Other entrants
The following players received wildcards into the singles main draw:
  Yshai Oliel 
  Nino Serdarušić 
  Evgenii Tiurnev

The following player received entry using a protected ranking:
  Pablo Andújar

The following players received entry from the qualifying draw:
  Egor Gerasimov 
  Yoshihito Nishioka 
  Emil Ruusuvuori
  Botic van de Zandschulp

Doubles main-draw entrants

Seeds

 Rankings are as of October 18, 2021

Other entrants
The following pairs received wildcards into the doubles main draw:
  Jonathan Erlich /  Andrei Vasilevski 
  Daniil Golubev /  Evgenii Tiurnev

References

External links
Official website

St. Petersburg Open
St Petersburg Open
St Petersburg Open
St. Petersburg Open